Sven Lakenmacher (born 26 May 1971) is a former East German and German male handball player. He was a member of the Germany men's national handball team. He was part of the  team at the 2000 Summer Olympics, playing two matches. On club level he played for TuS N-Lübbecke in Lübbecke.

His father was handball player Wolfgang Lakenmacher, who competed for East Germany at the 1972 Summer Olympics.

References

Living people
Handball players at the 2000 Summer Olympics
1971 births
German male handball players
Olympic handball players of Germany
Sportspeople from Magdeburg